This is an alphabetical list of the fungal taxa as recorded from South Africa. Currently accepted names have been appended.

Ma
Genus: Macowania
Macowania agaricina Berk.

Genus: Macowaniella
Macowaniella congesta Doidge
Macowaniella myrsinicola Doidge

Genus: Macowanites Kalchbr. (1882), accepted as Russula Pers. (1796)
Macowanites agarieinum Kalchbr.

Genus: Macrodiplodia
Macrodiplodia corticale Kalchbr. & Cooke

Genus: Macrophoma
Macrophoma agapanthi Trav.
Macrophoma aloes Scalia.
Macrophoma artemisiae Berl. & Vogl
Macrophoma cattleyicola P.Henn.
Macrophoma clematidis Togn.
Macrophoma curvispora Peek. accepted as Neofabraea malicorticis H.S.Jacks., (1913)
Macrophoma dryopteris Verw. & du Pless.
Macrophoma falconieri P.Henn.
Macrophoma oleae Berl. & Vogl.
Macrophoma palnuirum Berl. & Vogl.
Macrophoma pinea Petrak & Syd.
Macrophoma sp.

Genus: Macrophomina
Macrophomina limbalis Syd.
Macrophomina phaseoli (Maubl.) S.F. Ashby (1927) accepted as Macrophomina phaseolina (Tassi) Goid. (1947)

Genus: Macrosporium
Macrosporium camelliae Cooke & Mass.
Macrosporium carotae Ellis & Langl., (1890), accepted as Alternaria dauci (J.G.Kühn) J.W.Groves & Skolko, (1944)
Macrosporium citri McAlp.
Macrosporium cladosporioides Desm.
Macrosporium commune Rabenh., (1870), accepted as Pleospora herbarum (Pers.) Rabenh. (1857)
Macrosporium cucumerinum Ellis & Everh., (1895) accepted as Alternaria cucumerina, (Ellis & Everh.) J.A.Elliott, (1917)
Macrosporium eucalypti P.Henn.
Macrosporium iridis Cooke & Ell.
Macrosporium lanceolatum Mass.
Macrosporium longipes Ell. & Everh.
Macrosporium maydis Cooke & Ell.
Macrosporium nigricantium Atk.
Macrosporium nobile Vize.
Macrosporium oleae Berl. & Vogl.
Macrosporium phaseoli Fautr.
Macrosporium porri Ell.
Macrosporium punctatum Kalchbr. & Cooke
Macrosporium sarcinula Berk.(1838), accepted as Pleospora herbarum (Pers.) Rabenh. (1857)
Macrosporium solani Ell. & Mart. accepted as Alternaria solani Sorauer, (1896)
Macrosporium tabacinum Ell. & Mart.
Macrosporium tomato Cooke
Macrosporium vitis Sorok.
Macrosporium sp.

Genus: Madurella
Madurella sp.

Genus: Malacaria
Malacaria meliolieola Syd.

Genus: Malassezia
Malassezia furfur Baillon.

Genus: Marasmius
Marasmius calopus Fr.
Marasmius candidus Fr.
Marasmius delectans Morgan.
Marasmius epiphyllus Fr.
Marasmius filaris Kalchbr. & MacOwan.
Marasmius haematocephalus Mont. ex Fr.
Marasmius hariolorum Quel.
Marasmius helvolus Berk.
Marasmius oreadoides Pass.
Marasmius petalinus Berk. & Curt.
Marasmius rotula Fr.
Marasmius saccharinu Fr.
Marasmius scorodonius (Fr.) Fr., 1826  accepted as Mycetinis scorodonius (Fr.) A.W.Wilson & Desjardin, 2005
Marasmius siccus Fr.
Marasmius splachnoides Fr.
Marasmius tener Berk. & Curt.
Marasmius togoensis P.Henn.
Marasmius thwaitesii Berk. & Br. 
Marasmius torquescens Quel.
Marasmius ustorum Berk.
Marasmius sp.

Genus: Maronea (Lichen)
Maronea constans Hepp.
Maronea crassilabra H.Magn.
Maronea horizoides Wain.

Genus: Marssonina
Marssonia castagnei Sacc.
Marssonina fragariae (Lib.) Kleb., (1918) accepted as Diplocarpon earlianum (Ellis & Everh.) F.A.Wolf [as 'earliana'], (1924)
Marssonina juglandis (Lib.) Magnus, (1906) accepted as Ophiognomonia leptostyla (Fr.) Sogonov, Stud. Mycol. 62: 62 (2008)
Marssonina populi Magn.
Marssonina sp.

Genus: Massecella
Massecella flueggeae Syd. (sic)

Me
Genus: Medusula
Medusula disjectans Nyl.

Genus: Megalonectria
Megalonectria nigrescens Sacc.
Megalonectria pseudotrichia (Schwein.) Speg., (1881). accepted as Nectria pseudotrichia (Schwein.) Berk. & M.A. Curtis, (1853)

Genus: Megalospora
Megalospora lutea Flotow.
Megalospora stellenboschiana Zahlbr.
Megalospora versicolor Zahlbr.

Genus: Megatrichophyton
Megatrichophyton roseum Doidge

Family: Melampsoraceae (Rusts)

Genus: Melampsora
Melampsora aecidioides Schroet.
Melampsora helioscopiae Wint.
Melampsora hyperici Schroet.
Melampsora hypericorum Wint. var. australis Doidge
Melampsora junodii Doidge
Melampsora lini Lev.
Melampsora mixta Schroet.
Melampsora puccinioides Wint.
Melampsora ricini Pass.
Melampsora stratosa Cooke
Melampsora tremulae Tul.
Melampsora vitellinae Thuem.

Genus: Melampsorella
Melampsorella ricini de Toni

Genus: Melampydium
Melampydium metabolum Müll.Arg. subsp. africanum Zahlbr.

Genus: Melanaspicilia
Melanaspicilia aethalea Wain.
Melanaspicilia epichlora Vain.

Genus: Melanconiaceae
Melanconiaceae

Genus: Melanconiales
Melanconiales

Genus: Melanconium
Melanconium fourcroyae Syd.
Melanconium sacchari Massee, (1896), accepted as Phaeocytostroma sacchari (Ellis & Everh.) B. Sutton, (1964)

Genus: Melanogaster
Melanogaster ambiguus Tul.
Melanogaster owanianum Kalchbr.

Genus: Melanops
Melanops perseae Petrak.

Genus: Melanopsamma
Melanopsamma parasitica Sacc.

Genus: Melanopsichium
Melanopsichium austro-americanum G.Beck

Genus: Melanospora
Melanospora parasitica (Tul.) Tul. & C.Tul. (1865)accepted as Syspastospora parasitica (Tul.) P.F.Cannon & D.Hawksw. (1982)

Genus: Melanotheca
Melanotheca oculea Stizenb.

Genus: Melasmia
Melasmia confluens v.Hohn. 
Melasmia parinarii P.Henn.

Genus: Melaspilea (Lichens and lichenocolous)
Melaspilea gemella Nyl.

Genus: Melastiza
Melastiza charteri Boud.

Genus: Meliola
Meliola acanthacearum Hansf.
Meliola acridocarpi Doidge
Meliola allophyli Doidge
Meliola amphitricha Fr.
Meliola apodytis v.d.Byl
Meliola arcuata Doidge
Meliola argentina Speg.
Meliola atalayae Doidge
Meliola atra Doidge
Meliola azimae Doidge
Meliola behniae Syd.
Meliola bifida Cooke
Meliola bosciae Doidge
Meliola braehyodonta Syd.
Meliola buxicola Doidge
Meliola campylotricha Syd.
Meliola capensis Theiss.
Meliola capnodioides Thuem.
Meliola carissae Doidge
Meliola celtidicola v.d.Byl
Meliola choristylidis Doidge
Meliola cladophila Syd.
Meliola chidotricha Lev.
Meliola clavieulata Doidge
Meliola cluytiae v.d.Byl.
Meliola cnestidis Doidge
Meliola comata Doidge
Meliola conferta Doidge
Meliola cryptocaryae Doidge
Meliola cylindripoda Doidge
Meliola dactylipoda Syd.
Meliola ditricha Doidge
Meliola doidgeae Syd.
Meliola draeaenicola Pat. & Har.
Meliola dummeri Hansf. var. brachyodonta Hansf.
Meliola evansii Doidge
Meliola excoecariae Doidge
Meliola falcata Syd.
Meliola furcillata Doidge
Meliola ganglifera Kalchbr.
Meliola gemellipoda Doidge
Meliola geniculata Syd. & Butler var. macrospora Doidge
Meliola glabra Berk. & Curt.
Meliola gloriosa Doidge
Meliola goniomae Doidge
Meliola heudeloti Gaill.
Meliola hippocrateae Doidge
Meliola impatientis Doidge
Meliola indigoferae Syd.
Meliola inermis Kalchbr. & Cooke.
Meliola jasminicola P. Henn.
Meliola kentaniensis Doidge
Meliola knowltoniae Doidge
Meliola knysnae Doidge
Meliola leptidea Syd.
Meliola littoralis Syd.
Meliola loxostylidis Doidge
Meliola macowaniana Thuem.
Meliola malacotricha Speg.
Meliola manca Ell. & Mart.
Meliola merrillii Syd.
Meliola microspora var. africana Doidge
Meliola microthecia Thuem.
Meliola natalensis Doidge
Meliola natalensis var. conferta Doidge
Meliola natalensis var. lara Doidge
Meliola ochnae Doidge
Meliola oleicola Doidge
Meliola oleicola var. jasmini Doidge
Meliola oliniae Kalchbr.
Meliola oncinotidis Doidge
Meliola osyridis Doidge
Meliola palmieola Wint.
Meliola panici Earle.
Meliola peddieicola Hansf.
Meliola peglerae Doidge
Meliola peltata Doidge
Meliola perpusilla Syd. var. congoensis Beeli.
Meliola petiolaris Doidge
Meliola podocarpi Doidge
Meliola polytrieha Kalchbr. & Cooke
Meliola popowiae Doidge
Meliola psilostomae Thuem.
Meliola psychotriae Earle.
Meliola ptaeroxyli Doidge
Meliola puiggarii Speg.
Meliola quinquespora Thuem.
Meliola rhoina Doidge
Meliola rhois P.Henn.
Meliola rhois var. tenuis Doidge
Meliola rigida Doidge
Meliola sapindacearum Speg.
Meliola scabra Doidge
Meliola sclerochitoni Kalchbr.
Meliola scolopiae Doidge
Meliola sinuosa Doidge
Meliola speciosa Doidge
Meliola strophanthi Doidge
Meliola thuemeniana Stev.
Meliola toddaliae Doidge
Meliola torta Doidge
Meliola transvaalensis Doidge
Meliola varia Doidge
Meliola woodiana Sacc.
Meliola xumenensis Doidge
Meliola zehneriae v.d.Byl.
Meliola sp. var. M. capnodioides Thuem.
Meliola sp.

Family: Meliolaceae

Genus: Meliolaster
Meliolaster mackenzii Doidge

Genus: Meliolina
Meliolina arborescens Syd. 
Meliolina cladotricha Syd.
Meliolina irenicolum Stevens.

Genus: Melogramma
Melogramma eucalypti Kalchbr. & Cooke

Family: Melogrammataceae

Genus: Memnoniella
Memnoniella echinata Gall.

Genus: Menispora
Menispora cylindrica Kalchbr. & Cooke

Merulioidea

Genus: Merulius
Merulius alneus (L.) J.F.Gmel. (1792), accepted as Schizophyllum commune Fr. (1815)
Merulius corium Fr. 
Merulius gelatinosus Lloyd
Merulius himantoides Fr.
Merulius lacrymans Fr.
Merulius pinastri Burt.
Merulius rufus Pers. ex Fr.
Merulius serpens Tode ex Fr.
Merulius squalidus Fr.
Merulius tremellosus Schrad. (1794), accepted as Phlebia tremellosa (Schrad.) Nakasone & Burds. (1984)

Genus: Metarrhizium
Metarrhizium anisopliae Sorokin

Genus: Metasphaeria
Metasphaeria brachiata Sacc.
Metasphaeria caffra Petrak.
Metasphaeria cumana Sacc.
Metasphaeria metuloidea Sacc.

Mi
Genus: Microcallis
Microcallis nuxiae Hansf.
Microcallis oleae Hansf.

Genus: Microcyclus
Microcyclus kentaniensis Doidge
Microcyclus osyridis  (Cooke) Sacc. (1904), accepted as Microcyclus amphimelaenus (Mont.) Arx [as amphimelaena], in Müller & von Arx,(1962)
Microcyclus tassianus (Sacc.) Syd. & P. Syd. (1904), accepted as Microcyclus amphimelaenus (Mont.) Arx [as amphimelaena], in Müller & von Arx,(1962)

Genus: Microdiplodia
Microdiplodia rikatliensis Petrak.

Genus: Micropeltis
Micropeltis maratliae P.Henn.
Micropeltis stigma Cooke
Micropeltis trichomanis P.Henn.

Genus: Microphiale
Microphiale lutea Zahlbr.

Genus: Microsphaera
Microsphaera alni (DC. ex Wallr.) G. Winter, (1884), accepted as Microsphaera penicillata (Wallr.) Lév., (1851)
Microsphaera polonica Siemaszko.

Genus: Microsporon
Microsporon furfur Robin.

Genus: Microsporum
Microsporum audouinii Gruby.

Genus: Microstroma
Microstroma albizziae Syd.
Microstroma album Sacc.
Microstroma quercinum Niessl.
Microstroma quercinum f. roboris Thuem.

Genus: Microthelia
Microthelia confluens Müll.Arg.
Microthelia macrocarpoides Zahlbr.
Microthelia micula Korb.
Microthelia uniserialis Zahlbr.

Fanily: Microthyriaceae

Family: Microthyriae

Order: Microthyriales

Genus: Microthyriella
Microthyriella transvaalensis Doidge

Genus: Microthyrium
Microthyrium annuliforme Syd. 
Microthyrium maculicolum Doidge
Microthyrium ranulisporum Doidge

Genus: Milesina
Milesina dieteliana P.Magn.
Milesina nervisequa Syd.

Mo
Genus: Mollisia
Mollisia aquosa Phill.
Mollisia cinerea Karst.
Mollisia subgilva Kalchbr. & Cooke

Genus: Monascus
Monascus ruber van Tiegh.
 
Genus: Monilia accepted as Monilinia
Monilia balcanica Castellani & Chalmers. 
Monilia bethaliensis Pijper
Monilia fimicola Cost. & Matr.
Monilia krusei Castellani & Chalmers
Monilia pseudolondinensis Castellani & Chalmers
Monilia pseudotropicalis Castellani & Chalmers
Monilia rugosa Castellani & Chalmers
Monilia sitophila Sace.
Monilia zeylanica Castellani & Chalmers
Monilia sp.

Genus: Monochaetia
Monochaetia camelliae Miles.
Monochaetia cydoniae Pole Evans & Doidge

Genus: Monoicomyces
Monoicomyces zealandicus Thaxt.

Genus: Montagnella
Montagnella asperata Syd.
Montagnella maxima Mass.
Montagnella peglerae Pole Evans

Family: Montagnellaceae

Genus: Montagnites
Montagnites candollei Fr.

Genus: Morphella
Morphella conica Pers.
Morphella esculenta Pers.

Genus: Morenoella
Morenoella oxyanthae Doidge
Morenoella phillipsii Doidge

Genus: Morenoina
Morenoina africana Doidge
Morenoina dracaenae Doidge

Family:Mortierellaceae

Mu
Family:Mucedinaceae

Genus: Mucor
Mucor clavatus Linn.
Mucor exitiosus Mass.
Mucor hiemalis Wehm.
Mucor mucedo Linn.
Mucor racemosus Pres.
Mucor rouxii Calm.
Mucor stercorius Link.

Family: Mucoraceae

Family: Mucorales

Genus: Mucronella
Mucronella aggregata Fr.

Genus: Mutinus
Mutinus bambusinus Ed.Fisch.
Mutinus curtisii Ed.Fisch.
Mutinus simplex Lloyd.

My
Mycelia sterilia

Genus: Mycena
Mycena acicula Quel.
Mycena alcalina Quel.
Mycena actiniceps Sacc.
Mycena arguta Sacc.
Mycena capillaris Quel.
Mycena elavicularis Gill.
Mycena corticola Quel.
Mycena debilis Quel.
Mycena dilatata Gill. 
Mycena dregeana Sacc.
Mycena galericulata S.F.Gray
Mycena heliscus Sacc.
Mycena hiemalis Quel.
Mycena macrorrhiza Sacc.
Mycena rhodiophylla Sacc.
Mycena sciola Sacc.
Mycena tenerrima (Fr.) Quél. (1874),accepted as Mycena adscendens (Lasch) Maas Geest. (1981)
Mycena tintinnabula Quel.
Mycena vitrea Quel.
Mycena vulgaris Quel.
Mycena sp.

Genus: Mycenastrum
Mycenastrum corium (Guers.) Desv. (1842),
Mycenastrum lejospermum Mont.
Mycenastrum phaeotrichum Berk.

Genus: Mycobilimbia (Lichens)
Mycobilimbia aeervata Vouaux.
Mycobilimbia quatemella Vouaux.

Genus: Mycoderma
Mycoderma pararugosum Dodge

Genus: Mycogone
Mycogone aurantiaca da Cam.
Mycogone sp.

Genus: Mycolangloisia
Mycolangloisia nitida Hansf.

Genus: Mycoleptodon Pat. (1897), accepted as Steccherinum Gray (1821)
Mycoleptodon ochraeeum Pat.

Family:Mycoporaceae

Genus: Mycoporellum
Mycoporellum lahmii Müll.Arg.
 
Genus: Mycoporum
Mycoporum lahmii Stizenb.
Mycoporum pycnocarpum Nyl.

Genus: Mycosphaerella
Mycosphaerella agapanthi Lindau.
Mycosphaerella aloes Syd.
Mycosphaerella areola Ehrlich & Wolf.
Mycosphaerella brassicaecola Lindau.
Mycosphaerella byliana Syd.
Mycosphaerella citrullina (C.O. Sm.) Grossenb., (1909), accepted as Didymella bryoniae (Fuckel) Rehm, (1881)
Mycosphaerella dichrostachydis v.d.Byl
Mycosphaerella fragariae (Tul.) Lindau, 1897,
Mycosphaerella gibelliana Pass.
Mycosphaerella gossypina Atk.
Mycosphaerella loranthi Syd.
Mycosphaerella maculiformis (Pers.) J. Schröt., (1894), accepted as Mycosphaerella punctiformis (Pers.) Starbäck, (1889)
Mycosphaerella moelleriana Lindau.
Mycosphaerella moricola Linn.
Mycosphaerella nemesiae Dipp.
Mycosphaerella pinodes Stone. (sic), possibly (Berk. & A. Bloxam) Vestergr., (1912)accepted as Didymella pinodes (Berk. & A. Bloxam) Petr., (1924)
Mycosphaerella plectranthi Doidge
Mycosphaerella rubi Roark
Mycosphaerella schoenoprasi Schroet. (sic) possibly Rabenh., (1894) [1897], accepted as Davidiella tassiana (De Not.) Crous & U. Braun, (2003)
Mycosphaerella sentina (Fr.) J. Schröt., (1894), accepted as Mycosphaerella pyri (Auersw.) Boerema, (1970)
Mycosphaerella theae Shaw

Family: Mycosphaerellaceae

Genus: Mycotoruloides
Mycotoruloides triades Langeron & Talice.

Family: Myriangiaceae

Order:Myriangiales

Genus: Myriangium
Myriangium montagnei Berk.

Genus: Myriostoma
Myriostoma coliformis Corda.

Genus: Myrothecium
Myrothecium verrucaria Alb. & Schw.

Genus: Mystrosporium
Mystrosporium alliorum Berk.
Mystrosporium aterrimum Berk. & Curt.
Mystrosporium polytrichum Cooke
Mystrosporium velutinum Kalchbr. & Cooke

Genus: Myxosporium
Myxosporium corticola Edgert.

References

Sources

See also
 List of bacteria of South Africa
 List of Oomycetes of South Africa
 List of slime moulds of South Africa

 List of fungi of South Africa
 List of fungi of South Africa – A
 List of fungi of South Africa – B
 List of fungi of South Africa – C
 List of fungi of South Africa – D
 List of fungi of South Africa – E
 List of fungi of South Africa – F
 List of fungi of South Africa – G
 List of fungi of South Africa – H
 List of fungi of South Africa – I
 List of fungi of South Africa – J
 List of fungi of South Africa – K
 List of fungi of South Africa – L
 List of fungi of South Africa – M
 List of fungi of South Africa – N
 List of fungi of South Africa – O
 List of fungi of South Africa – P
 List of fungi of South Africa – Q
 List of fungi of South Africa – R
 List of fungi of South Africa – S
 List of fungi of South Africa – T
 List of fungi of South Africa – U
 List of fungi of South Africa – V
 List of fungi of South Africa – W
 List of fungi of South Africa – X
 List of fungi of South Africa – Y
 List of fungi of South Africa – Z

Further reading
Kinge TR, Goldman G, Jacobs A, Ndiritu GG, Gryzenhout M (2020) A first checklist of macrofungi for South Africa. MycoKeys 63: 1-48. https://doi.org/10.3897/mycokeys.63.36566

  

Fungi
Fungi M